Belliyappa Bangarappa is a 1992 Indian Kannada-language comedy drama film directed by Poorna Pragnya, written by Singeetham Srinivasa Rao  and produced by Madhu Bangarappa. The film stars Kumar Bangarappa and Amala, whilst a large number of popular actors including Vishnuvardhan, Shiva Rajkumar, V. Ravichandran, Tiger Prabhakar, Malashri and Sudharani appear in guest roles as themselves. Kumar Bangarappa played a dual role for the only time in his career. The film's music was composed by S. P. Balasubrahmanyam and cinematographer is B. C. Gowrishankar.

Cast

Principal appearances 
 Kumar Bangarappa as himself & Bettangeri Belliyappa
 Amala as Mutthamma
 K. S. Ashwath as Police Commissioner
 Balakrishna as Rajasuite Utthappa (Belliyappa's grandfather)
 Lokanath as Black Dogs Team Chief
 Girija Lokesh as Kaveramma (Belliyappa's Mother)
 Vaishali Kasaravalli as Mutthamma's Mother
 M. S. Umesh as Kumar's Secretary-1
 Master Anand
 Mandeep Roy as Kumar's Secretary-2
 Sihi Kahi Chandru
 Bank Janardhan as member of Black Dogs
 Aravind
 K. M. Rathnakar

Guest appearances 
 Vishnuvardhan
 Shiva Rajkumar
 V. Ravichandran
 Tiger Prabhakar
 Malashri
 Sudharani
 Srinath
 Vajramuni
 M. S. Rajashekar
 C. R. Simha
 Chi. Udaya Shankar
 V. K. Kannan

Soundtrack 
The music of the film was composed by S. P. Balasubrahmanyam with lyrics by Chi. Udaya Shankar.

References 

1992 films
1990s Kannada-language films
Indian comedy-drama films
1992 comedy-drama films
Films scored by S. P. Balasubrahmanyam